Fourth Church of Christ, Scientist may refer to:

 Fourth Church of Christ, Scientist (San Francisco, California), now the Internet Archive
 Fourth Church of Christ, Scientist (Denver, Colorado), now the Zen Center of Denver
 Fourth Church of Christ, Scientist (Milwaukee), now the Chinese Christian Church of Milwaukee
 Fourth Church of Christ, Scientist (New Orleans), formerly the Lakeview Presbyterian Church
 Fourth Church of Christ, Scientist (New York City), now the Hebrew Tabernacle of Washington Heights
 Fourth Church of Christ, Scientist (Seattle, Washington), now Town Hall Seattle

Christian Science churches